GenX is a Chemours trademark name for a synthetic, short-chain organofluorine chemical compound, the ammonium salt of hexafluoropropylene oxide dimer acid (HFPO-DA). It can also be used more informally to refer to the group of related fluorochemicals that are used to produce GenX. DuPont began the commercial development of GenX in 2009 as a replacement for perfluorooctanoic acid (PFOA, also known as C8).

Uses 
The chemicals are used in products such as food packaging, paints, cleaning products, non-stick coatings, outdoor fabrics and firefighting foam. The chemicals are manufactured by Chemours, a corporate spin-off of DuPont, in Fayetteville, North Carolina.

GenX chemicals are used as replacements for PFOA for manufacturing fluoropolymers such as Teflon, since PFOA and related compounds have been found to be toxic and carcinogenic. However, in lab tests on rats, GenX has been shown to cause many of the same health problems as PFOA.

GenX is one of many synthetic organofluorine compounds collectively known as per- and polyfluoroalkyl substances (PFASs).

Chemistry 
The manufacturing process combines two molecules of hexafluoropropylene oxide (HFPO) to form HFPO-DA. HFDO-DA is converted into its ammonium salt that is the official GenX compound.

The chemical process uses 2,3,3,3-tetrafluoro-2-(heptafluoropropoxy)propanoic acid (FRD-903) to generate ammonium 2,3,3,3-tetrafluoro-2-(heptafluoropropoxy)propanoate (FRD-902) and heptafluoropropyl 1,2,2,2-tetrafluoroethyl ether (E1).

When GenX contacts water, it releases the ammonium group to become HFPO-DA. Because HFPO-DA is a strong acid, it deprotonates into its conjugate base, which can then be detected in the water.

Pollution 
In North Carolina, the Chemours Fayetteville plant released GenX compounds into the Cape Fear River, which is a drinking water source for the Wilmington area.  A documentary film, The Devil We Know; a fictional dramatization, Dark Waters; and a nonfiction memoir, Exposure: Poisoned Water, Corporate Greed, and One Lawyer's Twenty-Year Battle Against DuPont by Robert Bilott, subsequently publicized the discharges, leading to controversy over possible health effects.

Mark Strynar and colleagues at the EPA first announced the discovery of HFPO-DA in the Cape Fear river in 2012, and had discovered an additional 11 polyfluoroalkyl substances (PFAS) in the river by 2014. These results were published as a formal paper in 2015.  The following year, North Carolina State University and the EPA jointly published a study demonstrating HFPO-DA and other PFAS were present in the Wilmington-area drinking water sourced from the Cape Fear river.  

In September 2017, the North Carolina Department of Environmental Quality (NCDEQ) ordered Chemours to halt discharges of all fluorinated compounds into the river.  Following a chemical spill one month later, NCDEQ cited Chemours for violating provisions in its National Pollutant Discharge Elimination System wastewater discharge permit.  In November 2017, the Brunswick County Government filed a federal lawsuit alleging that DuPont failed to disclose research regarding potential risks from the chemical.  

In spring 2018, Cape Fear River Watch sued Chemours for numerous Clean Water Act violations.  Meanwhile, traces of GenX were found in control wells surrounding a Miteni, SA plant in Trissino, Italy that had reprocessed Chemours fluoroether waste.  The resulting regulatory furor drove Miteni into bankruptcy.

That fall, NCDEQ filed a draft consent order concluding its GenX investigation. The order would require Chemours to reduce air pollution emissions and water pollution discharges of GenX and other chemicals, and would levy a $13-million civil penalty. In February 2019 a North Carolina Superior Court judge ordered Chemours to monitor GenX air emissions, analyze PFAS in river sediment and provide drinking water filtration systems.

In 2020 Michigan adopted drinking water standards for 5 previously unregulated PFAS compounds including HFPO-DA which has a maximum contaminant level (MCL) of 370 parts per trillion (ppt). Two previously regulated PFAS compounds PFOA and PFOS had their acceptable limits lowered to 8 ppt and 16 ppt respectively.

In 2022 Virginia's Roanoke River had become contaminated by GenX at levels reported to be 1.3 million parts per trillion.

Health effects 
GenX has been shown to affect the immune system by suppressing the ability of white blood cells to destroy pathogens.

Drinking water health advisories 
In June 2022 the U.S. Environmental Protection Agency (EPA) published drinking water health advisories, which are non-regulatory technical documents, for GenX and PFBS. The lifetime health advisories and health effects support documents assist federal, state, tribal, and local officials and managers of drinking water systems in protecting public health when these chemicals are present in drinking water.

EPA has listed recommended steps that consumers may take to reduce possible exposure to GenX and other PFAS chemicals.

See also 
 Perfluorinated alkylated substances (PFAS)
 Timeline of events related to per- and polyfluoroalkyl substances (PFAS)

References 

Chemical processes
Chemours
DuPont products
Pollutants